Martin Slovak (December 25, 1916 – March 22, 1950) was an American football player. He played college football for the University of Toledo and professional football in the National Football League (NFL) as a tailback and defensive back for the Cleveland Rams from 1939 to 1941. He appeared in 27 NFL games, six as a starter, and gained 396 rushing yards.

References

1916 births
1950 deaths
American football defensive backs
Toledo Rockets football players
Cleveland Rams players
Players of American football from Michigan